Gheorghe Cimpoia (born 14 October 1939) is a Romanian biathlete. He competed at the 1964 Winter Olympics and the 1968 Winter Olympics.

References

1939 births
Living people
Romanian male biathletes
Olympic biathletes of Romania
Biathletes at the 1964 Winter Olympics
Biathletes at the 1968 Winter Olympics
People from Râșnov